Aledo  (u--doh) is a city in Mercer County, Illinois, United States. The population was 3,633 at the 2020 census. It is the county seat of Mercer County.

History
Aledo was established in the 1850s when the railroad was extended to that point. It was briefly named "DeSoto", after Hernando de Soto, until the discovery of an identically named village in Jackson County, Illinois. Development began in the 1850s, and the oldest surviving buildings date from the following decade. A post office has been in operation at Aledo since September 24, 1856. In 1857, the county seat was moved to Aledo from Millersburg after a countywide referendum. Aledo was incorporated on August 15, 1863. In the 1950s, the first Tastee-Freez in the United States was built in the downtown.> The Downtown Aledo Historic District was established in 2016, with 75 contributing historic buildings in the downtown area.

Geography

Aledo is located in central Mercer County at  (41.200172, -90.749956). Illinois Route 17 passes through the city center on Third Street, leading east  to Viola and west  to New Boston on the Mississippi River. Illinois Route 94 follows IL 17 along Southeast Third Street turns south at the city center onto South College Avenue. IL 94 leads south-southwest  to Biggsville and northeast  to U.S. Route 67 on the southern outskirts of the Quad Cities.

The city sits on high ground that drains north to the Edwards River, a west-flowing direct tributary of the Mississippi, and south to Pike Run, a tributary of Pope Creek, which flows to the Mississippi at Keithsburg.

Climate

Demographics

As of the census of 2010, there were 3,640 people, 1,568 households, and 947 families residing in the city. The racial makeup of the city was 98.5% (3,586) white; 0.6% (22) African American; 0.0% (1) Native American; 0.3% (12) Asian; 0.1% (4) from other races; and 0.4% (15) from two or more races. Hispanic or Latino of any race were 1.2% (45) of the population.

There were 1,568 households, out of which 24.5% had children under the age of 18 living in them, 49.0% were married couples living together, 3.6% had a male householder with no wife present, 7.8% had a female householder with no husband present, and 39.6% were non-families. 35.7% of all households were made up of individuals, and 20.2% had someone living alone who was 65 years of age or older. The average household size was 2.20 and the average family size was 2.84.

The male population made up 47.5% (1,728), the female population made up 52.5% (1,912). There was 6.3% (229) of the population under 5 years; 17.1% (622) from 5 to 19 years; 10.3% (374) from 20 to 29 years; 10.2% (368) from 30 to 39; 12.5% (453) from 40 to 49; 12.9% (472) from 50 to 59; 12.1% (441) from 60 to 69; 8.2% (296) from 70 to 79; and 10.6% (385) were 80 years and over. The median age was 45.8 years.

The 2009-2013 American Community Survey estimated the median income in 2013 for a household in the city to be $39,424, and the median income for a family to be $56,546. Full-time, year-round male workers were estimated to have a median income of $44,435 versus $30,357 for females. The per capita income for the city was $21,373. About 15.0% of families and 18.4% of the population were estimated below the poverty line, including 22.1% of those under age 18 and 11.7% of those age 65 or over.

The American Community Survey estimated that in 2013 there were 1,740 civilians 16 years and over employed. Of those, 33.7% were estimated to be employed in educational services, health care or social assistance; 14.3% in manufacturing; 10.0% in construction; 8.4% in retail trade; 6.8% in professional, scientific, management, administrative or waste management services; 6.1% in finance, insurance, real estate, rental and leasing; 4.8% in arts, entertainment, recreation, accommodation or food services; and the remaining 15.9% in other (including agriculture, forestry, fishing and hunting, mining, wholesale trade, transportation and warehousing, utilities, information, public administration, and other services).

Notable people 

 Gertrude Abercrombie, Surrealist painter
 Suzy Bogguss, country western singer
 Oscar E. Carlstrom, Illinois Attorney General
 Herschel L. Carnahan, 30th lieutenant governor of California
 Dora Doxey, tried for murder in 1910 and found not guilty
 Peaches Graham, Major League Baseball catcher
 Doris Emrick Lee, artist
 Frank Lewis Marsh, educator and creationist
 Dewey McDougal, Major League Baseball pitcher
 Margo Price, singer-songwriter
 Guy C. Scott, Chief Justice of the Illinois Supreme Court and mayor of Aledo
 Judson Welliver, presidential speech writer

Education
Aledo was the home to William & Vashti College (1908–1917) — the campus/buildings were purchased and used by the Roosevelt Military Academy from 1924 to 1973. The Administration Building was torn down, and the spot was used to construct an assisted living facility. The remaining two buildings (Niles Hall and North Hall) are unused. William & Vashti College was a member of the Illinois Intercollegiate Athletic Conference from 1910 to 1917.

The High School Mascot used to be the Aledo Green Dragons. School colors were Forest Green and White. The Class of 2006 had 71 students, which is about an average class size.

Mercer County High School offers a variety of course curriculum in the sciences, math, literature, social sciences, and the arts. The school has a concert band, jazz band, marching band, concert choir, and swing choir.

The school also offers a variety of athletics including volleyball, football, both men and women's golf, men and women's basketball, wrestling, track and field, softball, baseball, and cross country. Some extracurricular activities that students can become involved in are scholastic bowl, football, basketball, pom poms, cheerleading, flags, majorettes, and musicals.

From 1915 to 2009, Aledo High School competed in boys football. They qualified for the state tournament on 17 occasions since the tournament began in 1974. From 1998 to 2006, Aledo High School has reached the finals of five IHSA boys' football championship tournaments. Of those five, the school won three times.

Aledo School District #201 and Westmer School District #203 have consolidated since the 2009–2010 school year.
The consolidation was voted upon by both school boards and was on the ballot for the 2008 election. The measure passed by a 76% margin.

The new consolidated district is Mercer County District #404 and the new mascot adopted by popular vote in early 2009 is the Mercer County Golden Eagles. School colors changed to navy blue and vegas gold. The Class of 2010 had over 120 students, well above the usual average.

Culture and media
Aledo hosts two annual festivals, the Rhubarb Fest and Antique Days. The Rhubarb Festival, which is held every June in the city downtown, offers a variety of rhubarb-related activities, ranging from rhubarb pie sales to free rhubarb seed distributions. The festival additionally offers other crafts and forms of entertainment and music; it has been undertaken every year since 1991. The city of Aledo's Antique Days festivals likewise occur annually in the month of September, and includes a citywide food festival, music from local residents and the high school music departments, and sports competitions among communities in the area.

Aledo has its own radio station, WRMJ-FM. WRMJ features country music along with live sports, local news and local programming. It broadcasts on a frequency of 102.3 MHz from a tower west of Aledo. The radio station serves most of Mercer County, and was founded in 1979. Mercer County's weekly newspaper, The Times Record, is based in Aledo and is owned by [[Gannett]]. National Communications Magazine, a publication for radio hobbyists, moved its operations from Ohio to Aledo in 2014 after being acquired by a local resident.

References

External links

Cities in Illinois
Cities in Mercer County, Illinois
County seats in Illinois